The Hartford Courant is the largest daily newspaper in the U.S. state of Connecticut, and is considered to be the oldest continuously published newspaper in the United States.  A morning newspaper serving most of the state north of New Haven and east of Waterbury, its headquarters on Broad Street in Hartford, Connecticut is a short walk from the state capitol. It reports regional news with a chain of bureaus in smaller cities and a series of local editions. It also operates CTNow, a free local weekly newspaper and website.

The Courant began as a weekly called the Connecticut Courant on October 29, 1764, becoming daily in 1837. In 1979, it was bought by the Times Mirror Company.  In 2000, Times Mirror was acquired by the Tribune Company, which later combined the paper's management and facilities with those of a Tribune-owned Hartford television station.  The Courant and other Tribune print properties were spun off to a new corporate parent, Tribune Publishing, separate from the station, in 2014. Tribune Publishing agreed in May 2021 to be acquired by Alden Global Capital, which operates its media properties through Digital First Media. The transaction was finalized on May 25, 2021.

History and age

The Connecticut Courant began as a weekly on October 29, 1764, started by Thomas Green. The Hartford Courant became daily in 1837, although it still published a weekly edition until 1896. The daily Hartford Courant traces its existence back to the weekly, thereby giving it the title "America's oldest continuously published newspaper", and leading it to adopt "Older than the nation" as its slogan. 

The Hartford Courant is considered to be the nation's oldest continuously published newspaper, and is cited as such in scholarly articles, journalism, and historical texts. The New Hampshire Gazette, which started publication in 1756, trademarked the title of oldest paper in the nation after being revived as a small biweekly paper in 1989. Prior to 1989, the paper had all but disappeared into other publications for most of the 20th century, which puts its self-proclaimed status as oldest newspaper in doubt. The New York Post claims to be the oldest continuously published daily newspaper; although the Post started daily publishing 35 years before The Connecticut Courant did, the Courant existed as a weekly paper for nearly 40 years before the New York Post was founded, making the Courant the older paper. In fact, The Providence Journal has become the oldest continuously published daily newspaper in the United States: The Journal began daily publishing 28 years after the New York Post, but strikes at the Post in 1958 and 1978 cast doubt on its continuity. Regardless, The Connecticut Courant existed as a weekly paper for nearly 70 years before the Providence Journal was founded. 

In 1867, Joseph Roswell Hawley, a leading Republican politician and former governor of Connecticut, bought the newspaper, which he combined with the Press. Under his editorship, the Courant became the most influential newspaper in Connecticut and one of the leading Republican papers in the country.

Emile Gauvreau became a reporter in 1916, and the managing editor in 1919. His energetic and often sensational news policies affronted Charles Clark, the owner and editor. Clark fired Gauvreau when he refused to stop a series of stories about the exploitation of fake medical diplomas. Gauvreau went on to be a major figure in the New York City tabloid wars of the Roaring Twenties as the first managing editor of the New York Evening Graphic and later managing editor of the New York Mirror.

Herbert Brucker was the most prominent editor of the Courant in the 20th century.

Recent history

The Courant was purchased in 1979 by Times Mirror, the Los Angeles Times parent company for $105.6 million. The first years of out-of-town ownership are described by a former Courant reporter in a book titled Spiked: How Chain Management Corrupted America's Oldest Newspaper.  One criticism was that the new owners were more interested in awards, and less interested in traditional Courant devotion to exhaustive coverage of  local news.

The Courant won a 1992 Pulitzer Prize for inquiring into problems with the Hubble Space Telescope (a Connecticut company was involved in the construction), and it won a 1999 Pulitzer Prize in the Breaking News category for coverage of a 1998 murder-suicide that took five lives at Connecticut Lottery headquarters. A series of articles about sexual abuse by the head of a worldwide Catholic order, published since February 1997, constituted the first denunciation of Marciel Maciel known to a wider audience.

In 2000, Times Mirror and the Courant became part of the Tribune Company, one of the world's largest multimedia companies. By then the Courant had acquired the Valley Advocate group of "alternative" weeklies started by two former Courant staff members in 1973.  Tribune also owned two local television stations:  Fox affiliate WTIC-TV and The CW affiliate WCCT-TV.

In 2005, The Courant became the most recent American newspaper to win the Society for News Design's World's Best Designed Newspaper award.  In 2006, the paper's investigation into mental health and suicides among Americans serving in the Iraq war was featured in the PBS documentary series Exposé: America's Investigative Reports in an episode entitled "Question 7."

In late June 2006, the Tribune Co. announced that Courant publisher Jack W. Davis Jr. would by replaced by Stephen D. Carver, vice president and general manager of Atlanta, Ga., TV station WATL. In March 2009, Tribune replaced Carver with Richard Graziano, who was given a dual role as Courant publisher and general manager of Tribune's two Hartford television stations. In May of the same year, Tribune announced that Jeff Levine, a newspaper executive with a background in marketing, would become "director of content" and that the editor or "print platform manager" of the Courant would report to Levine as would the news director of WTIC-TV. Shortly after that, the Courant's two highest ranking editors were let go.

After 2010, Courant has offered early retirement and buyout packages to reduce staff as it continues to experience declines in advertising revenue. There have also been layoffs and reduction in pages.  Newsroom staff peaked in 1994 at close to 400 staff, down to 175 staff by 2008, and 135 staff in 2009.

Tribune Company brought frequent changes in the Courant's top leadership. On November 18, 2013, Tribune appointed Nancy Meyer as publisher, succeeding Rich Graziano who left to become president and general manager of WPIX-TV (PIX11) in New York City.  In 2014, the Courant purchased the ReminderNews chain of weekly newspapers.

On October 10, 2014, Tribune Company announced the appointment of Rick Daniels as publisher of the Courant, succeeding Nancy Meyer, who was promoted to publisher and CEO of the Orlando Sentinel.

Andrew Julien was named the combined publisher and editor in March 2016, replacing Tom Wiley, who departed after two months.

In 2018, the Hartford Courant joined more than 300 newspapers in releasing editorials in response to President's Trump's anti-media rhetoric, a show of solidarity initiated by The Boston Globe. "The Hartford Courant joins newspapers from around the country today to reaffirm that the press is not the enemy of the American people." 

In October 2020, the Courant announced that it would be discontinuing printing the paper in Hartford and outsourcing future printing to the Springfield Republican in Massachusetts.

In December 2020, Tribune Publishing announced that it would be closing the Courant'''s Broad Street newsroom by the end of the year with no current plans to open another.

 Name 
The word "courant" derives from the French courante nouvellen, indicating current news items, possibly borrowed by way of the Dutch krant. Courant was occasionally a name for English-language newspapers, including the New-England Courant (Boston), founded by James Franklin in 1721.

 News and editorial 

 Executive editor: Helen Bennett
 Managing editor: Kellie Love 
 Content editor: Kaitlin McCallum
 Sports editor: William Dayton

 Awards 

 Pulitzer Prize 
Nancy Tracy of the Hartford Courant was a 1984 Pulitzer Prize Finalist in Feature Writing for her moving depiction of Meg Casey, a victim of premature aging.

Robert S. Capers and Eric Lipton of the Hartford Courant won the 1992 Pulitzer Prize in Explanatory Journalism for their series on how a flawed mirror built at Connecticut's Perkin-Elmer Corporation immobilized the Hubble Space Telescope.

The Hartford Courant Staff won the 1999 Pulitzer Prize in Breaking News Reporting for its coverage of a shooting rampage in which a state lottery employee killed four supervisors then himself.

Reporters Mike McIntire and Jack Dolan of the Hartford Courant were 2001 Pulitzer Prize Finalists in Investigative Reporting for their work in revealing the mistakes of practicing doctors who have faced disciplinary action.

Photojournalist Brad Clift was a 2003 Pulitzer Prize Finalist in Feature Photography for his photo series "Heroin Town", which depicted heroin use in Willimantic.

Lisa Chedekel and Matthew Kauffman of the Hartford Courant were 2007 Pulitzer Prize Finalists in Investigative Reporting for their in-depth reporting on suicide rates among American soldiers in Iraq which led to congressional and military action addressing the issues raised in the series.

The Hartford Courant Staff was a 2013 Pulitzer Prize Finalist for its comprehensive and compassionate coverage of the 2012 shooting massacre at Sandy Hook Elementary School. The paper was given exclusive access originally to the investigative files collected by the FBI on the shooters life, growing up.

Politics
The paper endorsed George W. Bush in both the 2000 Presidential election and the 2004 Presidential election.

In the 2012 Presidential Election, the Courant endorsed President Barack Obama for a second term over Republican Mitt Romney.

The Courant weighed in on the contentious and antagonistic 2016 Presidential Election, endorsing Democrat Hillary Clinton over Republican candidate Donald Trump.

In August 2018 the Courant endorsed Ned Lamont in the Democratic primary as the only "credible" choice compared to rival Joe Ganim. The Courant went on to endorse independent candidate Oz Griebel in the general election.

For the 2020 Presidential Election, The Courant weighed in, endorsing Democrat Joe Biden over Republican candidate Donald Trump. The Courant took a stronger stance in its 2020 endorsement against Trump than it did in 2016, arguing that a vote for Trump was a vote for racism.

Controversies

Sleepy's
In August 2009, the Courant attracted controversy over its firing of George Gombossy, a 40-year veteran of the paper and its consumer advocate at the time. Gombossy charged that the Courant had spiked an article he had written about an ongoing investigation by the Connecticut attorney general accusing Sleepy's (a major advertiser in the paper) of selling used and bedbug-infested mattresses as new.Hartford Courant Consumer Columnist Fired For Pissing Off Advertiser, Consumerist blog, retrieved August 17, 2009.

Gombossy's lawsuit against the Courant was thrown out by a Connecticut Superior Court judge in July 2010.  In his decision, Judge Marshall K. Berger, Jr. remarked that newspaper owners and editors have a "paramount" right to "control [the] content of their papers," further observing that in his role at the Courant, Gombossy had "no constitutional right to publish anything."

However, Gombossy's attorneys filed a second complaint, and Judge Berger reinstated the complaint.  The case headed to trial in the fall of 2011.

Plagiarism
In September 2009 the Courant's publisher, Richard Graziano, publicly apologized as the newspaper accepted a plagiarism charge.  Competitors had accused the Courant of taking its content without permission and refusing to give proper credit.Hartford Courant Admits Plagiarism, Offers Apology  Editor and Publisher.

Website blockage in the European Union
In 2018, the Hartford Courant began banning users of the internet in the European Union from accessing its website because of its absence of data protection compliance.

References

Further reading
 McNulty, J. Bard. Older than the Nation: The Story of the Hartford Courant (1964)
 Smith, J. Eugene. 100 Years of Hartford's Courant: From Colonial Times through the Civil War'' (1949)

External links

The Courant mobile
History of the Hartford Courant
Columbia Journalism Review's "Who Owns What" page about media companies.
https://twitter.com/hartfordcourant
https://www.facebook.com/hartfordcourant/
https://www.youtube.com/user/hartfordcourantnews/featured

Newspapers published in Connecticut
Mass media in Hartford, Connecticut
Tribune Publishing
Companies based in Hartford, Connecticut
Publications established in 1764
1764 establishments in Connecticut
Works involved in plagiarism controversies
Pulitzer Prize-winning newspapers
Newspapers of colonial America